Jerry Mitchell is an American theatre director and choreographer.

Early life and education
Born in Paw Paw, Michigan, Mitchell later moved to St. Louis where he pursued his acting, dancing and directing career in theatre. Although he did not graduate from the Fine Arts college at Webster University in St. Louis after attending for a year, he later received an honorary degree from Webster University in 2005.

Career 
Mitchell's early Broadway credits were as a dancer in The Will Rogers Follies and revivals of Brigadoon and On Your Toes.

Mitchell's first professional credit as a choreographer was for the 1990 Alley Theatre world premiere of the musical Jekyll & Hyde. Mitchell's first Broadway production as sole choreographer was the 1999 revival of You're a Good Man, Charlie Brown, which he followed with The Full Monty.

Mitchell created and for many years directed the annual Broadway Bares benefit for Broadway Cares/Equity Fights AIDS.  In addition to the theatre, he has choreographed for films such as Camp, In & Out and Drop Dead Gorgeous. He garnered an Emmy Award nomination for his work on The Drew Carey Show.

In 2003 Mitchell was named one of Dance Magazine's "25 to Watch". He directed and choreographed Legally Blonde: The Musical, which opened in April 2007, and served as a mentor on Bravo's reality competition Step It Up and Dance in 2008.

Mitchell created, directed, and choreographed a stage show for Las Vegas, Peepshow, which opened at Planet Hollywood Resort and Casino in 2009. He was involved in workshops for the stage musical adaptation of the film Catch Me If You Can.

In 2013, Mitchell directed and choreographed the Broadway musical Kinky Boots. He won the Tony Award for Best Choreography and was nominated for the Tony Award for Best Direction of a Musical. He is the director of the new musical On Your Feet!, about the lives of Gloria and Emilio Estefan. The musical premiered in Chicago in June 2015 and opened on Broadway at the Marquis Theatre on November 5, 2015.

He is the director and choreographer of the new musical Half Time, based on the film Gotta Dance, which began performances on December 13, 2015 at Chicago’s Bank of America Theatre, and ran through January 17, 2016. The musical has the book by Chad Beguelin and Bob Martin, music by Matthew Sklar and lyrics by Nell Benjamin, with additional music by Marvin Hamlisch. The musical opened at the Paper Mill Playhouse in Millburn, New Jersey on May 31, 2018.

Personal life 
He is openly gay.

Stage work 
 Jekyll & Hyde (World Premiere)
 Three Men on a Horse (1993 revival)
 Grease (1994 revival)
 Jekyll & Hyde (1999 Second National Tour)
 You're A Good Man, Charlie Brown (1999 Revival)
 The Rocky Horror Show (2000 revival)
 The Full Monty (2000)
 Hairspray (musical) (2002 Broadway) (2007 & 2020 West End)
 Imaginary Friends (2002)
 Gypsy (2003 revival)
 Never Gonna Dance (2003)
 La Cage aux Folles (2004 revival)
 Dirty Rotten Scoundrels (2005)
 Legally Blonde: The Musical (2007)
 Peepshow (2009 Las Vegas)
 Catch Me If You Can (2009 Seattle, 2011 Broadway)
 Love Never Dies (2010 West End)
 Kinky Boots (musical) (2013 Broadway) (2014 US Tour) (2015 West End)
 On Your Feet! (2015 Chicago and Broadway) (2019 West End)
 Pretty Woman: The Musical (2018 Chicago and Broadway) (2020 West End)

Awards and nominations 
Drama Desk Awards

Laurence Olivier Awards

Tony Awards

References

External links
 
 
 

American male dancers
American choreographers
American male musical theatre actors
American musical theatre directors
Drama Desk Award winners
Helpmann Award winners
People from Paw Paw, Michigan
Tony Award winners
Webster University alumni
Living people
1960 births
American gay actors
LGBT dancers